is a Japanese fish-shaped cake, commonly sold as street food. The most common filling is red bean paste that is made from sweetened adzuki beans. Other common fillings may be custard, chocolate, cheese, or sweet potato. Smaller, differently shaped versions called  are also available and often sold in bags of five, ten, or more.

Ingredients

 is made using regular pancake or waffle batter. The batter is poured into a fish-shaped mold for each side. The filling is then put on one side and the mold is closed. It is then cooked on both sides until golden brown.

History

 was first sold in Japan in 1909.

Seijirō Kobe, founder of the store , was having trouble selling his , so he decided to bake the cakes into fish shapes resembling , or red sea bream.  are considered a symbol of luck and fortune in Japan, and were an expensive fish only affordable by the higher classes or on special occasions. Masamori Kobe, the fourth owner of the store, stated that Seijirō wanted to give the ordinary people a taste of the expensive fish at low prices.

Since its creation,  has evolved into many variations, with different ingredients being used for filling and batter, as well as variations in shapes and sizes.

During the postwar period,  spread to other Asian countries, as well as to the United States.

Gallery

See also

, a similar Korean snack
, a song about taiyaki
, Japanese confectionery

References

Cakes
Wagashi